Raising Helen is a 2004 American comedy-drama film directed by Garry Marshall and written by Jack Amiel and Michael Begler. It stars Kate Hudson, John Corbett, Joan Cusack, Hayden Panettiere, siblings Spencer and Abigail Breslin, and Helen Mirren. It grossed $37,486,138 at the U.S. box office.

Plot
Helen, Jenny and Lindsay Harris are close sisters living in New York; the eldest Jenny raised the other two after their mother died when they were young. Jenny and Lindsay are responsible stay-at-home mothers while Helen, an executive assistant to the CEO of one of Manhattan's most prestigious modelling agencies, enjoys a lavish, carefree lifestyle.

One morning, Helen receives a call from Jenny who tells her Lindsay and her husband Paul have died in a car accident, leaving behind their three children, 15-year-old Audrey, 10-year-old Henry, and 5-year-old Sarah. At an appointment with Lindsay's attorney, both Helen and Jenny are shocked to discover Lindsay has appointed Helen guardian of the children. Both sisters are given a letter that Lindsay had left for them.

Forced to give up her wild lifestyle and move to Queens, Helen initially struggles to raise the children on her own. As time goes by, her concentration at work begins to slip and she is fired as a result, leading her to become a receptionist at a car dealership. Helen and Jenny get into a fight about how best to raise the children and they stop talking. Things later start to improve for Helen after she begins dating Dan Parker, the children's school principal and pastor, who helps her bond with them.

Audrey starts to fall in with the wrong crowd at school and gets an older boyfriend called BZ. When she disappears after prom, Helen is forced to call Jenny for back up, too scared to take control of the situation on her own in fear that Audrey will hate her if confronted. Audrey is found at a motel with BZ, and Helen later turns the children over to Jenny's custody, much to their dismay.

Helen goes back to work and slowly returns to her previous way of living, but soon realizes she is not happy. She goes to Jenny's to take the children back, adamant she is ready to put her foot down and be a mother, but Jenny asks her to leave and think about it some more. Later that night, as Helen sits alone in the nearby park, Jenny appears and allows Helen to read her letter from Lindsay; in it, Lindsay explains she chose Helen to care for her children because their personalities are so similar and she wanted the children to have a mother figure who reminds them of her.

Finally having accepted Helen can cope, Jenny returns the children to her the following morning, and they happily begin to settle in to their new family life.

Cast

Music
The featured song Whip It by Devo was used in the movie. The song was used in its original meaning of solving problems after single Helen becomes the guardian for three of her late sister's children.

Release
The film was shown at the 2004 Tribeca Film Festival. It was released theatrically in the United States on May 28, 2004. In US theaters, the film was preceded by an animated short film from Walt Disney Feature Animation titled Lorenzo, about a cat who gets his tail jinxed and comes to life.

Box office
The film opened at number four on opening weekend, making $10.9 million. In North America, the film made $37,486,512 overall. In foreign countries, it made $12,232,099. The film made $49,718,611 in its entire run, on a $50 million budget, making the film a box-office bomb.

Reception
Raising Helen received mostly negative reviews from critics. On the review aggregator website Rotten Tomatoes, the film holds an approval rating of 25% based on 133 reviews, with an average rating of 4.7/10. The website's critics consensus reads, "As shallow and formulaic as a sitcom." Metacritic, which uses a weighted average, assigned the film a score of 38 out of 100, based on 34 critics, indicating "generally unfavorable reviews".

Home media
The film was released on DVD and VHS on October 12, 2004. To date, the film has not been released on Blu-ray.

References

External links

 
 
 
 
 The Top Movies, Weekend of May 28, 2004 at The Numbers.

2004 films
2004 romantic comedy-drama films
2000s American films
2000s English-language films
American romantic comedy-drama films
Beacon Pictures films
Films about families
Films about fashion in the United States
Films directed by Garry Marshall
Films produced by David Hoberman
Films scored by John Debney
Films set in Manhattan
Films set in Queens, New York
Films shot in Los Angeles
Films shot in New Jersey
Films shot in New York City
Hyde Park Entertainment films
Mandeville Films films
Touchstone Pictures films